Evans Peninsula is an ice-covered peninsula about  long, between Koether Inlet and Cadwalader Inlet in the northeast part of Thurston Island. Cape Braathen is an ice-covered cape at the northwest termination of Evans Peninsula. It was discovered in flights from the USS Burton Island and USS Glacier by personnel of the U.S. Navy Bellingshausen Sea Expedition in February 1960, and was named by the Advisory Committee on Antarctic Names (US-ACAN) for Commander Griffith Evans, Jr., commander of the icebreaker Burton Island during this expedition.

The western end of the peninsula is ice-covered Cape Walden. The northwest termination of the peninsula is ice-covered Cape Braathen. These features were first delineated from air photos taken by U.S. Navy Squadron VX-6 in January 1960, and named by US-ACAN. Cape Walden was named for Arthur T. Walden, dog driver and leader of the Queen Maud Mountains Supporting Party of the Byrd Antarctic Expedition in 1928–30. Cape Braathen was named for Christoffer Braathen, ski expert and dog driver with the Byrd Antarctic Expedition of 1928–30.

Maps
 Thurston Island – Jones Mountains. 1:500000 Antarctica Sketch Map. US Geological Survey, 1967.
 Antarctic Digital Database (ADD). Scale 1:250000 topographic map of Antarctica. Scientific Committee on Antarctic Research (SCAR), 1993–2016.

References 

Peninsulas of Ellsworth Land
Thurston Island